The Scent of the Night is a 2001 novel by Andrea Camilleri, translated into English in 2005 by Stephen Sartarelli. It is the sixth novel in the internationally popular Inspector Montalbano series.

Plot summary
Inspector Montalbano must track down a lost financial manager who seems to have absconded with all of his clients' money. Along the way, he encounters a lovelorn secretary who believes her boss could do no wrong.

Trivia
The novel openly cites Faulkner's short story, "A Rose for Emily".

References 

2001 Italian novels
Inspector Montalbano novels
Italian crime novels
Italian mystery novels
Novels set in Sicily
Picador (imprint) books